Tahli may refer to:

Tahli, Dasuya, village in Hoshiarpur, Punjab, India
Tahli, Nakodar, village in Jalandhar, Punjab, India

See also 
 Thali (disambiguation)